Raffaele Rubino (born 9 January 1978) is an Italian former footballer and sporting director.

Playing career
Rubino started his career at Bari. He then played for Bisceglie of Serie C2, which also location within the province of Bari. He played 3 Serie C2 seasons, and followed the team played at Serie D. In mid-1999, he joined Brescello of Serie C1. In January 2000, he left for Pro Sesto of Serie C2. In summer 2001, he left for Novara of Serie C2, which he scored 16 league goals. He was spotted by Serie B club Siena, which he was signed in co-ownership deal after a successful loan with the Serie B champion. He just played 5 league matches before left on loan to Torino of Serie B. He was bought back in June 2004 by Novara, but in January 2005 he left again for Salernitana of Serie B. After another season with Novara, he signed a reported 2-year contract with Perugia of Serie C1.

Novara
In summer 2007  he re-joined Novara.

After the club relegated from Serie A, he signed a new 2-year contract with Novara.

Post-playing career
After retiring in 2015, Rubino was hired as a scout for his former club S.S.C. Bari. He left the position in August 2016 to join S.S.D. Palermo at the club's new chefscout under sporting director Daniele Faggiano. In January 2017, he moved to Parma Calcio alongside Faggiano and worked in a similar role.

In August 2018 he was unveiled as new director of football of Serie C club Trapani. He was removed from his role on 1 May 2019 after disagreements with the new ownership of Maurizio De Simone.

Following Trapani's promotion to Serie B by the end of the season and another change of ownership, on 8 July 2019 Rubino was re-hired as director of football of the Granata. He was released on 20 October 2019.

Honours
Serie B: 2003

References

External links
 Profile at Novara 
 Profile at Football.it 

Italian footballers
S.S.C. Bari players
S.S.D. Pro Sesto players
Novara F.C. players
A.C.N. Siena 1904 players
Torino F.C. players
U.S. Salernitana 1919 players
A.C. Perugia Calcio players
A.S. Bisceglie Calcio 1913 players
A.C. Prato players
Serie A players
Serie B players
Serie C players
Association football forwards
Footballers from Bari
1978 births
Living people